USCGC Point Gammon (WPB-82328) was an  Point class cutter constructed at the Coast Guard Yard at Curtis Bay, Maryland in 1962 for use as a law enforcement and search and rescue patrol boat.

Construction and design details
Point Gammon  was built to accommodate an 8-man crew. She was powered by two  VT600 Cummins diesel main drive engines and had two five-bladed  propellers. The main drive engines were later replaced by  VT800 Cummins engines. Engine exhaust was ported through the transom rather than through a conventional stack permitting a 360 degree view from the bridge a useful feature in search and rescue work.

She had a steel hull, an aluminum superstructure with a longitudinally framed construction to save weight. Controls were located on the bridge which allowed one-man operation and eliminated an engineer watch in the engine room. For short periods, a crew of four men could operate the cutter, however, the need for rest brought the practical crew to eight for normal service. The screws were designed for ease of replacement and could be changed without removing the cutter from the water. A clutch-in idle speed of three knots helped to conserve fuel on lengthy patrols and she had an eighteen knot maximum speed.

The deckhouse contained the cabin for the officer-in-charge and the executive petty officer. The deckhouse also included  a small arms locker, scuttlebutt, desk and head. Access to the lower deck and engine room was via a ladder, at the bottom of which was the galley, mess and recreation deck. A watertight door at the front of the mess bulkhead led to the crew quarters which was ten feet long with six stowable bunks, three on each side. Forward of the bunks was the crew's head with sink, shower and commode, interior spaces were air-conditioned. Accommodation for a 13-man crew were installed for Vietnam War service.

History
After delivery in 1962, Point Gammon was assigned a homeport of Fort Bragg, California, where she served as law enforcement and search and rescue patrol boat. From 1963 to 1965, she was stationed at Alameda, California. On 20 April 1965, she dewatered and towed the disabled pleasure craft Amigo del Mar into Port Richmond, California.

At the request of the United States Navy, in April 1965, she was alerted for service in South Vietnam and assigned to Coast Guard Squadron One in support of Operation Market Time along with 16 other Point class cutters. While the crew completed overseas training and weapons qualifications at Coast Guard Island and Camp Parks, California, Point Gammon was loaded onto a merchant ship, and transported to Subic Bay, Philippines in May 1965 where she was refitted for combat service. Shipyard modifications included installation of new single-sideband radio equipment, floodlights, bunks, additional sound-powered phone circuits, and the addition of 4 M2 machine guns. The original bow-mounted machine gun was replaced with a combination over-under .50 caliber machine gun/81mm trigger fired mortar that had been developed by the Coast Guard for service in Vietnam.  For service in Vietnam, two officers were added to the crew complement to add seniority to the crew in the mission of interdicting vessels at sea.

After sea trials, the Division left Subic Bay for Da Nang on 16 July 1965 in the company of USS Snohomish County (LST-1126), their temporary support ship. After almost two weeks at sea, they arrived at their new duty station on 20 July and began patrolling the coastal waters near Danang. Duty consisted of boarding Vietnamese junks to search for contraband weapons and ammunition and check the identification papers of persons on board. Permanent engineering and logistic support of Division 12 was provided by a U.S. Navy non-self-propelled floating workshop, YR-71. During this time, the WPB's were directed to paint the hulls and superstructures formula 20 deck gray to cover the Coast Guard's normal white paint to increase the effectiveness of night patrols.

On 1 January 1967, Point Gammon was on Market Time patrol off An Xuyên Province with U.S. Navy Patrol Craft Fast PCF-68 and PCF-71 intercepted a North Vietnamese steel-hulled trawler. After a firefight involving both Market Time boats, PCF-68 hit the trawler with a mortar round that set the trawler on fire while Point Gammon provided covering fire and illuminated the target with her mortar. The trawler exploded and sank.

On 11 November 1969, Point Gammon was the first Division 12 cutter turned over to the Republic of Vietnam Navy as part of the Vietnamization of the war effort. She was recommissioned RVNS Nguyễn Đao (HQ-703).

Notes
Footnotes

Citations

References cited

External links
 "Point" Class 82-foot WPBs Coast Guard Historian's website

Gammon
1962 ships
Vietnam War patrol vessels of the United States
United States Coast Guard ships transferred to the Republic of Vietnam Navy
Ships built by the United States Coast Guard Yard